Chloroclystis angelica is a species of moth of the  family Geometridae. It is found in La Réunion.

References

Herbulot, Cl. 1968b. Note sur les Geometridae de l'île de la Réunion (Lep.). - Bulletin de la Société entomologique de France 79(1967)(9–10):289–291; pl. 8

Chloroclystis
Moths described in 1968
Moths of Réunion
Moths of Africa